Domitia viridipennis is a species of beetle in the family Cerambycidae. It was described by Chevrolat in 1855, originally under the genus Monohammus.

References

Lamiini
Beetles described in 1855